The Hale America National Open Golf Tournament was a professional golf tournament on the PGA Tour that played for a single year, 1942.

After the attack on Pearl Harbor and America's entry into World War II, the United States Golf Association's Executive Committee decided that it would be improper to play the 1942 U.S. Open. Additionally, the original site chosen for the event, Interlachen Country Club in Edina, Minnesota, opted not to serve as the host course. The USGA together with the PGA of America and the Chicago District Golf Association sponsored the Hale America Open in response to calls for a series of local tournaments to be played. It was intended to be a war-time substitute for the U.S. Open.

The event was held at Ridgemoor Country Club in Norwood Park Township, Cook County, Illinois from June 18–21, 1942. The proceeds raised by the event benefitted the Navy Relief Society and the USO.

The tournament was won by Ben Hogan with a total score of 17-under-par 271, with rounds of 72-62-69-68. The runners-up, Jimmy Demaret and Mike Turnesa, were three strokes behind. Hogan received a gold medal and $1,200 in War Bonds for his win.

Controversy
Supporters of Ben Hogan and some golf historians maintain that this tournament should count as one of Hogan's major championships, since it was run just like the U.S. Open with more than 1,500 entries, local qualifying at 69 sites and sectional qualifying at most major cities. Additionally, all of the big names in golf who were not fighting the war were in the field.

Winner

References

Former PGA Tour events
Golf in Chicago
1942 in Illinois